Homeland Solidarity Party (STAR) is a Sabah-based political party. The party was founded on 1 July 2016 by Datuk Seri Panglima Dr. Jeffrey G. Kitingan. He is Tan Sri Joseph Pairin Kitingan's younger brother, the former chief minister of Sabah and ex-president of United Sabah Party (PBS). STAR Party was one of four founding parties of the United Sabah Alliance (USA) founded in 2016, United Alliance of Sabah (UAOS) founded in 2018, and Gabungan Rakyat Sabah (GRS) founded in 2020, the other being the Sabah People's Ideas Party (GAGASAN), Sabah Progressive Party (SAPP) and United Sabah Party (PBS).

The party entered into an alliance with Barisan Nasional coalition after the 2018 Sabah state election and formed the state government. However, the state government lost power after a number of BN state assemblymen left and lent their support for the Parti Warisan Sabah, which subsequently replaced the STAR-BN government with the support of Pakatan Harapan. STAR later returned to power as part of the Gabungan Rakyat Sabah (GRS) coalition which was formed to contest the 2020 Sabah state snap-election. The party is actively researching and protecting the rights of the people of Sabah through the United Nations, UNESCO and also through all evidence documents. The party left the Perikatan Nasional (PN) opposition coalition on 5 December 2022 due to its irrelevance as a PN component party after the party decided to support the federal coalition government led by Pakatan Harapan (PH) as a GRS component party.

History 

 

Homeland Solidarity Party or Malay: Parti Solidariti Tanah Airku (StarSabah) was registered with the Registrar of Societies Malaysia ‘Registry of Societies’ on 30 June 2016. The party was preceded by the State Reform Party (Abbreviated STAR Borneo) founded by the late Dr. Patau Rubis in 1996. The party then established a branch in Sabah in 2011. After the late Dr. Patau Rubis died on March 20, 2016, the Sarawak Branch STAR Borneo Party led by Lina Soo and the Sabah Branch STAR Borneo Party led by Datuk Jeffrey G. Kitingan have separated ideologies and fought in their respective directions. The Sarawak State Reform Party eventually branded their party as Parti Aspirasi Rakyat Sarawak with the abbreviation ASPIRASI while the Sabah State Reform Party branded their party as Parti Solidariti Tanah Airku with the abbreviation STAR. The STAR Borneo Sarawak Party registered the name change as the ASPIRASI Party in 2020 and was approved in 2021 while the STAR Borneo Sabah Party re-registered the party as the Homeland Solidarity Party on 30 June 2016 and was approved in October 2016.

Party's Logo

Leadership Structure 

 Chairman:
Fred V. Marukau
 President:
 Jeffrey Gapari Kitingan
 Deputy President:
  Ellron Alfred Angin
  Fung Len Fui
  Robert Tawik
 Vice-Presidents:
 Annuar Ayub 
 Paul Porodong
 Stephen Teo
 Nawawi Saking
 Abidin Madingkir
 Kenny Chua Teck Ho
 Feddrin Tuliang
 Secretary-General:
 Edward Linggu Bukut
 Youth Chief:
 Kong Soon Choi
 Treasurer-General:
 Iskandar Abdul Malik Jangkat
 Women's Chief:
 Flovia Ng
 Assistant Secretary-Generals:
 Ardino Diris
 Gerald Rizal Johari
 Information Chief:
 Jalumin Bayogoh
 Assistant Treasurer-General:
 Arlinsia Agang

Elected representatives

Senators 

 His Majesty's appointee:

Dewan Rakyat (House of Representatives) 

STAR currently has only one MP in the House of Representatives.

Dewan Undangan Negeri (State Legislative Assembly) 

Sabah State Legislative Assembly

STAR state governments

General election results

State election results

References

External links 
 

Political parties in Sabah
2016 establishments in Malaysia
Political parties established in 2016